Stephen George Platten, FSA (born 17 May 1947, in Southgate) is a retired Anglican bishop. He was the last diocesan Bishop of Wakefield in the Church of England. He was consecrated in this role on 19 July 2003 and immediately prior to that was Dean of Norwich from 1995. He was installed at Wakefield Cathedral on 19 July 2003.

Early life and education
Platten was educated at the Stationers' Company's School. He has a Bachelor of Education (BEd) degree from the Institute of Education and a Postgraduate Diploma (PGDip) in Theology from Cuddesdon College. He was awarded a Bachelor of Divinity (BD) degree at Trinity College, Oxford. He is also an honorary Doctor of Letters (Hon DLitt) and was awarded an Hon. DUniv from the University of Huddersfield in 2012.

Ordained ministry
Platten was made deacon in 1975 and ordained priest in 1976 in the Diocese of Oxford. His ministry positions include being a residentiary canon at Portsmouth Cathedral and the Diocese of Portsmouth's Director of Ordinands (1983–1990), Archbishop of Canterbury's Secretary for Ecumenical Affairs (1990–1995). He is a member of the Third Order of Saint Francis (TSSF), and served as the Minister Provincial of its European Province from 1991 to 1996.

Between 1990 and 1995, Platten was Guestmaster of The Nikaean Club, a Lambeth Palace dining club with a focus on the ecumenical hospitality of the Archbishop of Canterbury.

Platten was admitted to sit in the House of Lords as one of the Lords Spiritual on 22 June 2009.

It was announced on 3 November 2013 that the Diocese of Wakefield, and therefore the post of Bishop of Wakefield, would be dissolved on 20 April 2014. In July 2014, he became Rector of St Michael's, Cornhill in the City of London and an honorary assistant bishop in the Diocese of London. He stepped down as rector in 2016, retiring elsewhere in the diocese and remaining assistant bishop in London, Southwark and Newcastle.

Ministry in Retirement

Between 2013 and 2020, Platten was Chairman of the Council of Hymns Ancient and Modern, Ltd.

In late 2020 he was elected Master of the Worshipful Company of Stationers & Newspaper Makers.

Views
Platten supports the ordination of women as priests and bishops.

On 11 February 2017, he was one of fourteen retired bishops to sign an open letter to the then-serving bishops of the Church of England. In an unprecedented move, they expressed their opposition to the House of Bishops' report to General Synod on sexuality, which recommended no change to the Church's canons or practices around sexuality. By 13 February, a serving bishop (Alan Wilson, Bishop of Buckingham) and nine further retired bishops had added their signatures; on 15 February, the report was rejected by synod.

Personal life
Platten is married to Rosslie, whose work is focused particularly on children with special needs. They have two sons, Aidan and Gregory, who are both also ordained in the Church of England.

His homepage states that he "has particular interests in the study of theology and relations with other churches. He has recently been appointed as Chairman of the Church of England Liturgical Commission, which seeks to develop the worshipping life of the church."

It also states that his interests include reading, walking, Northumberland and music.

Styles
 The Reverend Stephen Platten (1975–1983)
 The Reverend Canon Stephen Platten (1983–1995)
 The Very Reverend Stephen Platten (1995–2003)
 The Right Reverend Stephen Platten (2003—present)

Writings
 
 
 
 
  (with Mary Tanner)
 
 
 
 
 
 
 
 
 
 
 

He has also edited:
 Marriage, Helen Oppenheimer, Mowbray, London 1990
 Good for the Poor, Michael Taylor, Mowbray, London 1990
 Working with God, Andrew Stokes, Mowbray, London 1992
 The Ethics of I.V.F., Anthony Dyson, Mowbray, London 1995
 Dreaming Spires?: Cathedrals in a New Age, London, 2006
 Holy Ground: Cathedrals in the Twenty First Century. Sacristy Press. 2017.
 Oneness: The Dynamics of Monasticism. SCM Press. 2017.
 Austin Farrer for Today: A Prophetic Agenda (with Richard Harries). SCM Press. 2020.

He has edited and contributed to eight books:
 New Soundings, Darton, Longman and Todd 1997
 Flagships of the Spirit, Darton, Longman and Todd 1998
 Seeing Ourselves: Who are the Interpreters of Contemporary Society, Canterbury Press Norwich 1998
 The Retreat of the State: Nourishing the Soul of Society, Canterbury Press, Norwich 1999
 Ink and Spirit: Literature and Spirituality, Canterbury Press, Norwich 2000
 Open Government, Canterbury Press, Norwich 2000
 Runcie: On Reflection, Canterbury Press 2002
 Anglicanism and the Western Christian Tradition, Canterbury Press 2003
Reinhold Niebuhr and Contemporary Politics: God and Power. Oxford University Press. 2010 (with Richard Harries)
Comfortable Words: Polity, Piety and the Book of Common Prayer. SCM Press. 2012. (with Fr Christopher Woods).
Austin Farrer: Oxford Warden, Scholar and Preacher. SCM Press.2020. (With Markus Bockmuehl).

References

External links

 Diocese of Wakefield website information
 Photographs
 CV

Bishops of Wakefield (diocese)
1947 births
Living people
Alumni of Ripon College Cuddesdon
Alumni of the UCL Institute of Education
Alumni of Trinity College, Oxford
Deans of Norwich
People from Southgate, London
People educated at the Stationers' Company's School